José Francisco Gómez y Argüelles (died 1854) was acting President of Honduras 1 February - 1 March 1852.

1854 deaths
Presidents of Honduras
Year of birth unknown
19th-century Honduran people